The 1999 Kent State Golden Flashes football team was an American football team that represented Kent State University in the Mid-American Conference (MAC) during the 1999 NCAA Division I-A football season. In their second season under head coach Dean Pees, the Golden Flashes compiled a 2–9 record (2–6 against MAC opponents), finished in sixth place in the MAC East, and were outscored by all opponents by a combined total of 376 to 213.

The team's statistical leaders included Chante Murphy with 676 rushing yards, Jose Davis with 1,969 passing yards, and Jason Gavadza with 654 receiving yards.

Schedule

References

Kent State
Kent State Golden Flashes football seasons
Kent State Golden Flashes football